10979 Fristephenson, provisional designation , is a carbonaceous Sulamitis asteroid from the inner regions of the asteroid belt, approximately  in diameter. It was discovered during the Palomar–Leiden Trojan survey on 29 September 1973, by Ingrid and Cornelis van Houten at Leiden, and Tom Gehrels at Palomar Observatory in California, United States. The dark C-type asteroid was named for British historian of astronomy Francis Richard Stephenson.

Orbit and classification 

Fristephenson is a member of the Sulamitis family, a small family of 300 known carbonaceous asteroids named after 752 Sulamitis. It orbits the Sun in the inner main-belt at a distance of 2.3–2.7 AU once every 3 years and 10 months (1,407 days; semi-major axis of 2.46 AU). Its orbit has an eccentricity of 0.08 and an inclination of 6° with respect to the ecliptic. The body's observation arc begins at Palomar on 19 September 1973, ten days after its official discovery observation.

Palomar–Leiden Trojan survey 

The survey designation "T-2" stands for the second Palomar–Leiden Trojan survey, named after the fruitful collaboration of the Palomar and Leiden Observatory during the 1960s and 1970s. Gehrels used Palomar's Samuel Oschin telescope (also known as the 48-inch Schmidt Telescope), and shipped the photographic plates to Ingrid and Cornelis van Houten at Leiden Observatory where astrometry was carried out. The trio are credited with the discovery of several thousand asteroid discoveries.

Physical characteristics 

Fristephenson has an absolute magnitude of 15.1. Based on the Moving Object Catalog (MOC) of the Sloan Digital Sky Survey, the asteroid has a spectral type of a carbonaceous C-type asteroid, which agrees with its classification into the Sulamitis family, as well as with its low Geometric albedo measured by the Wide-field Infrared Survey Explorer. As of 2018, no rotational lightcurve has been obtained from photometric observations. The body's rotation period, pole and shape remain unknown.

Diameter and albedo 

According to the survey carried out by the NEOWISE mission of NASA's WISE telescope, Fristephenson measures 5.327 kilometers in diameter and its surface has an albedo of 0.057.

Naming 

This minor planet was named after Francis Richard Stephenson (born 1941), a British historian of astronomy at Durham University. The official naming citation was published by the Minor Planet Center on 26 November 2004.

References

External links 
 Asteroid Lightcurve Database (LCDB), query form (info )
 Dictionary of Minor Planet Names, Google books
 Discovery Circumstances: Numbered Minor Planets (10001)-(15000) – Minor Planet Center
 
 

010979
Discoveries by Cornelis Johannes van Houten
Discoveries by Ingrid van Houten-Groeneveld
Discoveries by Tom Gehrels
4171
Named minor planets
4386
19730929